Kostylevo is a rural locality (a village) in Kemskoye Rural Settlement, Nikolsky District, Vologda Oblast, Russia. The population was 10 as of 2002.

Geography 
Kostylevo is located 64 km northwest of Nikolsk (the district's administrative centre) by road. Verkhnyaya Kema is the nearest rural locality.

References 

Rural localities in Nikolsky District, Vologda Oblast